Snowed Under is a 1936 American romantic comedy film.

It may also refer to:

 "Snowed Under", a song on the B-side of a limited edition CD containing "Somewhere Only We Know" by Keane
 "Snowed Under", a 2006 Christmas song by Welsh folk singer Mary Hopkin
 Bob The Builder: Snowed Under: The Bobblesberg Winter Games, a 2006 video - see List of Bob the Builder home video releases